Luohu District is a district of Shenzhen, China, located north of the New Territories of Hong Kong, east of Futian District, southeast of Longgang District, southwest of Pingshan District, and west of Yantian District. It is one of the oldest parts of the city, having represented Shenzhen as a fishing village before 1953 and a market town from 1953 to 1979, when Bao'an County was promoted to a prefecture-level city and renamed Shenzhen.

History
Prior to the establishment of Shenzhen Special Economic Zone (SEZ), an original town called Shenzhen (or Shum Chun; Sham Chun) Hui was located within the current Luohu district. It was of size 350,000 m2 and has a population of little less than 30,000. The town centred at the present-day Dongmen, where a Tin Hau Temple once stood.

The name Shenzhen was first mentioned in 1410 though the town was only first documented in 1688 but was believed to be inhabited long before this. The market town prospered and expanded out of its boundaries in the early 20th century, following the completion of the Kowloon–Canton Railway, which the town was a stopping station. The town was occupied by Japanese forces between 1942 and 1945. It was promoted from market town to an official town status in 1950. In 1953, the administrative centre of San On County was moved to Shum Chun from Nantou.

After Shenzhen was promoted to city status in October 1979, Luohu district was established as the first district in Shenzhen. Several small mountains were flattened to facilitate its infrastructure during initial construction phases. In November 1997, Yantian area became an independent administrative district.

Some of the tallest and most recognizable buildings in Shenzhen, including Shun Hing Square, KK100 and the Guomao Building has are located within the district.

Geography

Luohu is located in the southern part of Shenzhen, with Futian district on its west, Yantian district on its east, and Longgang district on its north. The Shenzhen River, which separates the district from North District, Hong Kong forms its southern limits.

It is also one of the six administrative districts of the Shenzhen Special Economic Zone (SEZ) of Shenzhen City of the People's Republic of China.

Luohu has an uneven geography and contains a number of natural fresh water sources, including Donghu, Honghu, and Xianhu, among others. Shuiku, or "Water Reservoir", is also located in Luohu and is an important source of water for both Shenzhen and Hong Kong.

Shenzhen's highest peak, Wutong Mountain (944m) is in Luohu District.

The district's west boundary with Futian is Hongling Road, and its east boundary with Yantian is Wutong Mountain.

Subdistricts

Immigration Control Point

Luohu serves as an important immigration control between Hong Kong and mainland China. Two immigration control points, Luohu and Man Kam To, are located in the Luohu district. The Luohu immigration point is the busiest land boundary patrol connecting Hong Kong and mainland China. It consists of the Luohu Port on the mainland side, and the Lo Wu Control Point on the Hong Kong side.

Entertainment

Shopping

Luohu is known in Hong Kong and Guangdong for shopping. Most one-day visitors from Hong Kong limit their shopping to Luohu Commercial City, located right outside the Luohu Immigration Control Point, but the areas of Dongmen, Guomao, and Diwang are also important shopping districts.

Nightlife
Luohu district is also known for its nightlife. Though most expatriates residing in Shenzhen live in Shekou, visitors to Shenzhen from Hong Kong and other places typically frequent bars, KTV (karaoke) lounges, and night clubs in the Luohu area.

Education

As of the end of 2012,there are 221 educational institutions in Luohu District, amongst which 17 are secondary schools.

 Schools operated by the Shenzhen city government
Shenzhen Middle School
  (深圳市第二实验学校)
 Shenzhen Primary School (深圳小学)

Schools operated by the district government:
Luohu Foreign languages School
Cuiyuan Middle School
Binhe Middle School

Transportation

Trunk roads
Shennan East Road()
Dongmen Road
Yanhe Road() and Chunfeng Road Flyover
Nigang Road
Luosha Highway
Taoyuan Road

Buses and minibuses
Buses and minibuses serve as popular means of transportation modes in Luohu.

Shenzhen Railway
Shenzhen railway station (深圳火車站|深圳火车站) is located here. It serves as a terminal for train routes towards tens of cities in China.

Shenzhen Metro
Luohu is currently served by nine metro lines operated by Shenzhen Metro:

   - Luohu (  via Lo Wu), Guomao, Laojie , Grand Theater 
   - Grand Theater , Hubei, Huangbeiling , Xinxiu, Liantang Checkpoint, Xianhu Road, Liantang 
   - Laojie , Shaibu, Cuizhu, Tianbei , Shuibei, Caopu
   - Yinhu 
   - Hongling North , Sungang, Honghu, Tianbei , Tai'an 
   - Liantang , Wutong Mountain South
   - Yinhu , Nigang, Hongling North, Yuanling, Hongling , Hongling South, Ludancun, Renmin South, Xiangxicun, Wenjin
   - Luohu North

See also
List of tallest buildings in Shenzhen
Lo Wu (Hong Kong part of the original town of Luohu/Lo Wu within the Frontier Closed Area)

References

External links
Luohu Government Online

External links

Shopping in Dongmen

 
Districts of Shenzhen
Divided cities